"Hogcock!" is the twelfth episode of the seventh season of the American television comedy series 30 Rock, the 137th overall episode, and the first part of the one-hour series finale. It was directed by Beth McCarthy-Miller and written by Jack Burditt and Robert Carlock. The episode originally aired as an hour-long episode, along with "Last Lunch", on NBC in the United States on January 31, 2013. Guest stars in this episode include James Marsden, Julianne Moore and Salma Hayek.

In the episode, Liz Lemon (Tina Fey) struggles to adjust to being a stay at home mom following the cancellation of TGS. Jack Donaghy (Alec Baldwin) attempts to turn Kabletown into a perfect company, but struggles with his increasing feelings of unhappiness. Tracy Jordan (Tracy Morgan) struggles to get a moment with Kenneth Parcell (Jack McBrayer), who is settling into his new role as head of NBC. Lastly, Jenna Maroney (Jane Krakowski) searches for her next move as an actress.

Together, "Hogcock!" and "Last Lunch" received acclaim from critics. According to Nielsen Media Research, the episodes were watched by 4.88 million viewers during their original broadcast, becoming 30 Rock's highest-rated episodes for two years.

Plot
Liz Lemon (Tina Fey) is struggling to adjust to being a stay-at-home mother and decides to pitch new network president Kenneth Parcell (Jack McBrayer) a television show about her life. He rejects it, however, explaining to her that "woman", "writer", "New York" and even "quality" are some of the new television no-nos he is adopting in order to try winning back a bigger audience to the network. Meanwhile, Jack Donaghy (Alec Baldwin) is busy trying to turn Kabletown into a perfect company, using the "Six Sigma Wheel of Domination", but is struggling to find fulfilment in it, pondering whether, as per his mother's dying sentiments, he is truly "happy". At TGS, Tracy Jordan (Tracy Morgan) is struggling to get on without Kenneth as his best friend and runner of all errands. He dismisses Grizz (Grizz Chapman) and Dot Com (Kevin Brown) as they try to explain to him that Kenneth is president of the network now. Finally, Jenna Maroney (Jane Krakowski) makes the horrifying discovery that her tantrums and unreasonable demands are being ignored by the crew, who are no longer contractually obliged to put up with her.

Stuck at home, Liz turns to a mothering forum and gets into an argument with another mother, which culminates in the pair agreeing to meet at Riverside Park in order to fight it out. However, upon arriving, Liz discovers that the other mother is in fact Criss (James Marsden), who is taking just as badly to having a job as she is to not having one. The pair realize that they are the wrong way around; Liz should be working and Criss should be the "stay at home mom." At TGS, Jenna decides to prepare for her next step, vowing to abandon comedy and only do dramatic roles. She gets a gig on Law & Order: Special Victims Unit, but is disappointed to find that she'll be playing a corpse. She attempts to rework the role by improvising that the corpse has come back to life with investigative powers, but is quickly fired. Undeterred, she instead vows to abandon television and move to Los Angeles to become a movie star. When she arrives in LA, she discovers that all of the women there are ridiculously young and beautiful, whick makes her quickly return to New York.

Tracy manages to get some time with Kenneth, but surprises him by asking him to ignore all his requests. He explains that when he became famous, a lot of people from his past wanted things from him. He doesn't want to be that person for Kenneth. He then asks Kenneth to go and fetch his car, which has broken down on the Long Island Expressway. Kenneth happily obliges, suggesting that their relationship will not change all that much. Elsewhere, Jack decides to launch an attack on his unhappiness by creating the "Six Sigma Wheel of Happiness Domination" and making improvements to every aspect of his life: among them, leading Kabletown to record high shares and organising a threesome with former girlfriends Nancy Donovan (Julianne Moore) and Elisa Pedrera (Salma Hayek). However, despite all his efforts, he is forced to concede that he remains unfulfilled.

For the sake of staying in work, Liz decides to give Kenneth what he wants: a bad show. She pitches him "Hardly Working", which is about a man called John Hardly who loves his family and hates the rat race. Kenneth rejects it and tells her that she needs to make another episode of TGS. He explains that there is a strange clause in Tracy's contract that states he must be paid thirty million dollars by the network if TGS produces fewer than 150 episodes, and the current total is 149. Annoyed, Liz goes to Jack for a job, but he tells her that he has quit due to his lack of fulfilment. He blames her for ruining him, as she made him care about things other than work. She in turn blames him for ruining her, as he made her care about work too much. Jack retorts that he only ever called her for one meeting seven years ago, but that she kept returning and their friendship got out of hand. The pair conclude that they should only ever have been employer and employee, and nothing more.

Reception

The hour-long broadcast of "Hogcock!" and "Last Lunch" was watched by 4.88 million viewers and earned a 1.9 rating/5 share in the 18–49 demographic. This means that it was seen by 1.9 percent of all 18- to 49-year-olds and 5 percent of all 18- to 49-year-olds watching television at the time of the broadcast. This represented a season high in total viewers and in the demographic, an increase of two million viewers over the previous season finale and the highest-rated episode of the series, in overall viewers, for two years. When data obtained from DVR viewers who watched the episode within seven days of broadcast was factored in, total viewership for the finale increased by 25 percent, to 6.13 million viewers, and viewership in the demographic increased by 37 percent, to a 2.6 rating.

References

External links

30 Rock (season 7) episodes
2013 American television episodes
Television shows directed by Beth McCarthy-Miller